Vocational education is that form of instruction designed to prepare people for industrial or commercial employment. It can be acquired either formally in trade schools, technical secondary schools, or in on-the-job training programs or, more informally, by picking up the necessary skills on the job.

CEO World magazine ranked India's economic growth rate at the beginning of the 21st century as among the 10 highest in the developing world. Combined with the fact that India has been ranked the 5th largest economy in the world, the latest survey of unemployment in India 2021-2022 shows the unemployment rate as 6.40%. The economic times revealed that labour market shrunk by 2.1 million in 2022.  

Employers requiring skilled workers and the employment-seeking population face issues like lower wages, poor working condition which puts India in a unique position.  A labour/skill shortage for industry survey by FICCI (Federation of Indian Chambers of Commerce) found that 90% of companies face a labour shortage. 89% of companies said that the demand for the product is not met due to labour shortages in the market. The research paper India’s dream run and its aftermath shows that India did see an economic boom from 2003-08 referred to as the dream run but not in the manufacturing sector, which made it difficult to provide jobs to unskilled and semi-skilled populations. This problem is aggravated due to a lack of skill development programs to bridge the labour demand and supply gap.

Courses By CBSE 
The Central Board of Secondary Education (CBSE) in India has included following vocational subjects in their senior secondary education:

Commerce based:
 Office Secretaryship 
 Stenography and Computer Applications
 Accountancy and Auditing
 Marketing and Salesmanship
 Banking
 Retail 
 Financial Market Management
 Business Administration

Engineering based:
 Electrical Technology
 Automobile Technology 
 Civil Engineering
 Air Conditioning and Refrigeration Technology 
 Electronics Technology
 Geospatial Technology
 Foundry
 IT Application

Health and Para Medical based:
 Ophthalmic Techniques 
 Medical Laboratory Techniques
 Auxiliary Nursing & Midwifery
 X-Ray Technician
 Healthcare Sciences
 Health and Beauty Studies
 Medical Diagnostics

Home Science based:
 Fashion Design & Clothing Construction
 Textile Design
 Design Fundamental
 Music Technical Production
 Beauty Services

Others:
 Transportation System & Logistic Management
 Life Insurance 
 Library and Information Sciences

Agriculture based:
 Poultry Farming
 Horticulture
 Dairying Science and Technology

Hospitality and Tourism based:
 Food Production
 Food and Beverage Services 
 Mass Media Studies and Media Production
 Bakery and Confectionery 
 Front office
 Travel and Tourism

Courses offered by Government of India 
 Udaan
 Polytechnics
 Parvaaz
National Rural Livelihood Mission
 Industrial Training Institutes
 Aajeevika mission of national rural livelihood
 Craftsmen Training Scheme

Challenges to Implement VET in India 
The challenges for the growth of vocational training such as traditional and cultural bias against non-white collar jobs. The lack of mechanism at the state level to work towards vocational education and training have been observed in the research paper.

The UGC and other bodies do not recognize vocational courses offered by the private institution leading to the low uptake of Vocational courses. The paper also mentioned an unemployment rate of 11% in VET courses.

Initiatives by Government   
After the National Skills Development Policy in 2009, the government created National Skills Coordination Board, the National Skill Development Corporation, and National Skills Qualification Framework. There was a commitment made by the Minister of Finance to inject Rs.1000 crore into the system structure.

Sector Skills Councils was established under NSDC, aiming to involve industry in training and labour force growth, set occupational standards, and accredit qualification. The creation of NSQF includes academic, vocational, and technical qualifications. It aims to facilitate the recognition of prior learning and improvement between the levels and types of education.

Schemes by Government 

 In 2014,     the National Skill Certification and Monetary Reward Scheme provided     monetary incentives on average of Rs.10,000 for completing certain     training programs. The target of the scheme was to upskill one million     young people.
 In 2015,     the Pradhan Mantri Kaushal Vikas Yojana scheme was launched to provide     skills to 2.4 million people. Out of the 2.4 million people, a million     were registered under the Recognition of Prior Learning Framework.
 The     Modular Employable Skills scheme focused on providing short-term training     in high-demand sectors and industries. The training fees incurred under     the scheme are refunded on completion of the certification. Also, female     candidates from backward castes are given discounts to encourage     participation.

Impact of VET on Economy 
The Institute of Applied Manpower Research argued that 291 million additional workers are required in 2022-2023. The government attempted to increase the VET in the country to upskill 500 million workers to reduce the gap.

A research article on vocational educational and training in India found that 11% of 15-29 years old who had received vocational education and training are unemployed. This trend is slowly reversing but still exists.

A study from the International Labour Organization shows that apprenticeships have the potential to contribute to the economy. It said that small businesses found the increased earnings associated with training outweighed the associated cost.

The NPSD recognized the informal sector's potential as a significant part of the economy.

References

Sources
CBSE Vocational Courses

Further reading 
‘Vocational education can be mainstream career option’ 
Vocational education mostly ineffective in India: Survey 
Cabinet approves establishment of National Council for Vocational Education and Training
The vocational way
Can vocational education make a comeback?

External links
Department of School and Education Literacy
Vocational education in India